The South African Army College is a training unit of the South African Army.

History

Origin of military training in South Africa

South African military training can be traced back to 1786 when the Militere Kweekskool was established by the Dutch East India Company to develop local cadets, but collapsed due to lack of funds.

Under the Union of South Africa’s Defence Act of 1912, allowance was made for a formal South African Military College. Two branches were initially set up namely the General Branch or military school and the Musketry Branch or musketry school.

Both branches were initially housed in Bloemfontein in the Free State. The military school received its first intake in that same year and by 1913 the musketry school began its first rifle instruction course. The school of musketry eventually became the Weapon Training Branch of the College. Another school was opened for signals training, also in Bloemfontein. All schools eventually were housed on Tempe and placed under a single command.

At this stage the unit became known as the South African Military Schools and was now composed of:

General Military Instruction,
Musketry,
Signals and
Medical Training.

World War One impact

On the outbreak of WW1, training staff were transferred for mobilisation training at Potchefstroom and some served overseas.

Developments in the 1920s and 30s

By the 1920s the unit was re-established at Roberts Heights near Pretoria and renamed the South African Military School. By 1923, a commissioning course was held, resulting in the school being declared a proper College.

The Air Force connection

An additional wing, the Air Staff Wing was opened for the development of personnel for the emerging South African Air Force, which did not have a training institution of its own at that stage.

Training expansion

By 1939, a further six branches had been created:

Physical Training
Camouflaging,
Armour,
Chemical Warfare,
Regimental and
Commando

World War 2

Approximately 150 000 students of all ranks received training at the Army College during the war. Several branches had also become schools in their own right and had moved to premises across South Africa. For example, Signals moved Potchefstroom becoming the Signals Training Centre. By the end of the war however, some branches such as the Chemical Warfare branch had been disbanded.

Training Developments after the War

Branches such as Administration and Ordinance started in the 1950s while joint training between the Army and Air Force came to an end with the eventual establishment of its Air Force College. In 1953 the Weapon Training Branch was redesignated the Infantry School; see South African Infantry School.

By the 1960s, Intelligence, Nuclear, Biological and Chemical branches was established as well. The Infantry School had moved to Oudtshoorn in the Cape.

Name Change

In 1968 the Chief of the Army changed the name of the unit to the South African Army College in order for it to fully develop its now uniquely Army character.

Insignia 

The wildebeest as the College’s symbol had been adopted around 1924. A shoulder flash was developed around 1963 displaying the wildebeest in a roundel of blue and maroon. The Wildebeest concept had originated from a trophy given to the Military School from the Mounted Rifles.

SADF era Dress Insignia

Notable Commandants

Note: Last attained rank of incumbent is used

 Maj Gen Evered Poole - later Deputy Chief of Staff, Union Defence Force 
 Lt Gen Willem Louw - later Chief of the Army
 Gen Constand Viljoen - later Chief of SADF
 Lt Gen Koos Bisschoff - later Chief of Staff Plans
 Lt Gen Wessel Kritzinger - later Chief of Staff Operations 
 Lt Gen Thabiso Mokhosi - later Chief of the Army 
 Lt Gen Xolani Ndhlovu - later Chief of Logistics

References

South African Army
Military education and training in South Africa
Military units and formations in Pretoria
Military units and formations established in 1968